Kathleen Miller (July 1, 1945 – October 7, 2016) was an American actress who gained fame for her appearances in several films directed by Hal Ashby. She also had a lead role on the television series Sirota's Court from 1976 to 1977.

Biography
Miller was born in Los Angeles, the daughter of Aaron Miller, an executive at Paramount Pictures, and Carolyn, an actress. She was a childhood friend of Candice Bergen. After appearing in stage productions in New York City (including a 1969 Broadway production of Butterflies Are Free) and an episode of Kojak, she was cast in The Last Detail (1973) by director Hal Ashby, playing a prostitute. Ashby subsequently cast her in Shampoo (1975), in which she portrayed a client of George Roundy (Warren Beatty). From 1976 to 1977, she starred as Gail Goodman on the short-lived series Sirota's Court.

In 1975, she had a large guest-starring role in the Starsky & Hutch episode "Death Ride" as an undercover police woman named Joanne pretending to be the daughter of a mobster. In 1976, she also starred as the daughter of Peter Fonda's character in Fighting Mad, a drama about an Arkansas farmer waging war on land developers. Her last film with Ashby was Coming Home (1978), a Vietnam-based war drama starring Jane Fonda, Jon Voight, and Bruce Dern.

Death
Miller died in Lynwood, California after a protracted illness.

Filmography

Film

Television

Stage credits

References

Sources

External links

1945 births
2016 deaths
Actresses from Los Angeles
American film actresses
American stage actresses
American television actresses
21st-century American women